Klemetsrud Church is a white-painted wooden church in the south eastern edge of Oslo, Norway. The church was consecrated on September 3, 1933. Architects of the church were Herman Major Backer (father of Lars Backer), and Einar Engelstad. Engelstad took over when Backer died the year before the church was finished.

The church was restored and expanded in 1982 with a separate congregation hall and chapel (designed by Rolf Christian Krognes). In the winter of 2008/09 an interior renovation was carried out.

The pulpit and the altar, as well as the chairs in the choir are carved by Anthon Røvik. The altarpiece is painted by Olaf Willums. The church has two church bells made by the Olsen Nauen Bell Foundry, cast the same year as the church was opened. The largest bell has a monogram of King Haakon VII on one side and the following inscription on the other side: "Klemetsrud kirke. Jeg kaller kom. Joh. 3.16" ("Klemetsrud Church. I call to come. John 3.16. ") The church organ is made by Josef Hilmar Jørgensen (delivered in 1933).

The church is surrounded by a cemetery.  Klemetsrud Church is listed and protected by law by the Norwegian Directorate for Cultural Heritage.

References

External links 
 Official website 

Lutheran churches in Oslo
Churches completed in 1933
1933 establishments in Norway
20th-century Church of Norway church buildings
Wooden churches in Norway
Cemeteries in Oslo